Lestes pinheyi is a species of damselfly in the family Lestidae, the spreadwings. It is known commonly as Pinhey's spreadwing. It is native to central Africa, where it is widespread. It lives in pools and swamps. It is not considered to be threatened.

References

P
Odonata of Africa
Fauna of Central Africa
Insects described in 1955
Taxonomy articles created by Polbot